Griswold Stadium is an American football and soccer stadium which serves as the home of the Lewis & Clark Pioneers football and soccer teams. It is located in Portland, Oregon, featuring an AstroTurf field and a seating capacity of 3,500. It has hosted track and field events as well. The land that the stadium sits on was forested before it was built. In 1952, Graham Griswold donated US$25,000 and lumber towards the erection of a new football stadium, complete with grandstands. The first game that occurred at the stadium took place on October 10, 1953, with Lewis & Clark against the Linfield Wildcats football team. It was officially named "Griswold Stadium" in 1954 after the benefactor of the construction project. In 2003, lights were installed at Griswold Stadium allowing for night games. The AstroTurf (GameDay Grass 3D brand) playing surface was purchased for the field in 2010. The school dedicated the field to former player and coach Fred Wilson that year. Located in the stadium is the Eldon Fix Track which was last resurfaced in 1999. In 2012, the grandstands were rebuilt to allow for 3,000 general admission seats and 500 VIP seats. In 1955, the Oregon state high school cross country championships took place at Griswold Stadium.

See also
 List of sports venues in Portland, Oregon

References

College football venues
Lewis & Clark Pioneers football
American football venues in Oregon
Soccer venues in Oregon
Sports venues in Portland, Oregon
Sports venues completed in 1955
1955 establishments in Oregon